Sestan may refer to:

 Nenad Sestan, professor at Yale School of Medicine.
 Konesestan, a village in Iran.
 Mate Šestan (born 1971), Croatian football player.